Pish Darreh (also Romanized as Pīsh Darreh; also known as Peshī Dar) is a village in Tabar Rural District, Jolgeh Shoqan District, Jajrom County, North Khorasan Province, Iran. At the 2006 census, its population was 259, in 62 families.

References 

Populated places in Jajrom County